Ishalino (İşäle) is a rural locality (a village) in Rostovsky Selsoviet, Mechetlinsky District, Bashkortostan, Russia. The population was 223 as of 2010. There are 2 streets.

Geography 
Ishalino is located 24 km northeast of Bolsheustyikinskoye (the district's administrative centre) by road. Telyashevo is the nearest rural locality.

References 

Rural localities in Mechetlinsky District